Unemployment Convention, 1919 is  an International Labour Organization Convention.

It was established in 1919:
Having decided upon the adoption of certain proposals with regard to the "question of preventing or providing against unemployment",...

Ratifications
As of 2013, the convention had been ratified by 57 states. Of the ratifying states, three have subsequently denounced the treaty.

External links
Text.
Ratifications and denunciations.

Unemployment
International Labour Organization conventions
Treaties concluded in 1919
Treaties entered into force in 1921
Treaties of Argentina
Treaties of Australia
Treaties of the First Austrian Republic
Treaties of Belgium
Treaties of Bosnia and Herzegovina
Treaties of the Central African Republic
Treaties of Chile
Treaties of Colombia
Treaties of Cyprus
Treaties of Denmark
Treaties of Djibouti
Treaties of Ecuador
Treaties of the Republic of Egypt (1953–1958)
Treaties of Estonia
Treaties of the Ethiopian Empire
Treaties of Finland
Treaties of the French Third Republic
Treaties of the Weimar Republic
Treaties of the Kingdom of Greece
Treaties of Guyana
Treaties of the Kingdom of Hungary (1920–1946)
Treaties of Iceland
Treaties of the Irish Free State
Treaties of the Kingdom of Italy (1861–1946)
Treaties of the Empire of Japan
Treaties of Kenya
Treaties of Luxembourg
Treaties of North Macedonia
Treaties of Malta
Treaties of Mauritius
Treaties of Morocco
Treaties of Myanmar
Treaties of the Netherlands
Treaties of New Zealand
Treaties of Nicaragua
Treaties of Norway
Treaties of Papua New Guinea
Treaties of the Second Polish Republic
Treaties of the Kingdom of Romania
Treaties of Serbia and Montenegro
Treaties of Seychelles
Treaties of Slovenia
Treaties of the Union of South Africa
Treaties of Spain under the Restoration
Treaties of the Republic of the Sudan (1956–1969)
Treaties of Sweden
Treaties of Switzerland
Treaties of the United Arab Republic
Treaties of Turkey
Treaties of Ukraine
Treaties of the United Kingdom (1801–1922)
Treaties of Venezuela
Treaties of Montenegro
Treaties of South Korea
Treaties extended to the Territory of Papua and New Guinea
Treaties extended to the Faroe Islands
Treaties extended to the Colony of the Bahamas
Treaties extended to Gibraltar
Treaties extended to Guernsey
Treaties extended to British Guiana
Treaties extended to Jersey
Treaties extended to British Kenya
Treaties extended to Basutoland
Treaties extended to the Isle of Man
Treaties extended to British Mauritius
Treaties extended to the Crown Colony of Seychelles
Treaties extended to the Crown Colony of Singapore
Treaties extended to Swaziland (protectorate)
Treaties extended to Northern Rhodesia
Treaties extended to Curaçao and Dependencies
1919 in labor relations